Electrostatic spray-assisted vapour deposition (ESAVD) is a technique (developed by a company called IMPT) to deposit both thin and thick layers of a coating onto various substrates. In simple terms chemical precursors are sprayed across an electrostatic field towards a heated substrate, the chemicals undergo a controlled chemical reaction and are deposited on the substrate as the required coating.  Electrostatic spraying techniques were developed in the 1950s for the spraying of ionised particles on to charged or heated substrates.

ESAVD (branded by IMPT as Layatec) is used for many applications in many markets including:
 Thermal barrier coatings for jet engine turbine blades
 Various thin layers in the manufacture of flat panel displays and photovoltaic panels, CIGS and CZTS-based thin-film solar cells.
 Electronic components
 Biomedical coatings
 Glass coatings (such as self-cleaning)
 Corrosion protection coatings

The process has advantages over other techniques for layer deposition (plasma, electron-beam) in that it does not require the use of any vacuum, electron beam or plasma so reduces the manufacturing costs. It also uses less power and raw materials making it more environmentally friendly. Also the use of the electrostatic field means that the process can coat complex 3D parts easily.

References

Further reading
 "Kwang-Leong Choy – Laying It on Thick And Thin".  Materials World. June 2003. Electrostatic spray-assisted vapour deposition (ESAVD), first reported in Materials World in March 1998, is a method for fabricating films and nanocrystalline powders. The inventor describes ongoing progress.
 Choy, K. L., "Process principles and applications of novel and cost-effective ESAVD based methods", in Innovative Processing of Films and Nanocrystalline Powders, K. L. Choy. ed. (World Scientific Publishing Company). 2002. pp. 15–69. .
 Choy, K. L., "Review of advances in processing methods: films and nanocrystalline powders", in Innovative Processing of Films and Nanocrystalline Powders, Choy, K. L. ed. (Imperial College Press), 2002, 1–14. 
 Choy, K. L., Progress in Materials Science, 48, 57(2003).
 Choy, K. L., "Vapor Processing of nanostructured materials", in Handbook of nanostructured materials and nanotechnology, Nalwa, H. S. ed. (Academic Press) 2000, 533. . Choy, K. L., Feist, J. P., Heyes, A. L. and Su, B., J. Mater. Res. 14 (1999) 3111.
 Choy, K. L., "Innovative and cost-effective deposition of coatings using ESAVD method", Surface Engineering, 16 (2000) 465.
 R. Chandrasekhar and K. L. Choy, "Electrostatic spray assisted vapour deposition of fluorine doped tin oxide", Journal of Crystal Growth, 231 (1–2) (2001) 215.

Thin film deposition
Semiconductor device fabrication
Metalworking
Coatings